Mario Erb (born 16 June 1990) is a German footballer who plays as a defender for TSG 1899 Hoffenheim II.

Career
Erb joined Bayern Munich in 1996, and progressed through the junior team, where he was part of the under-17 team that were national champions in 2007. In October 2008, he made his debut for the Bayern reserve team, replacing Daniel Sikorski in a 1–1 draw at Fortuna Düsseldorf. He made one more appearance in the 3. Liga that season, and 15 the following year, and established himself as a regular player during the 2010–11 season. With the departure of Maximilian Haas in January 2011, Erb was named as reserve team captain for the remainder of the season. He was unable to prevent the team being relegated, however, and he signed for Alemannia Aachen of the 2. Bundesliga in summer 2011. Erb was injured six games into his first season at Aachen, and had to sit out the remainder of the season, which ended in his second consecutive relegation. Aachen were relegated in the 2012–13 season as well, so Erb left the club in summer 2013, returning to Munich to sign for SpVgg Unterhaching.

In the summer 2015, Erb joined Rot-Weiß Erfurt

International career
Erb has represented the Germany youth team at under-17 to under-20 level, and played in all seven matches as the team finished third at the 2007 FIFA U-17 World Cup.

Career statistics

References

External links

1990 births
Living people
Association football defenders
German footballers
Germany youth international footballers
FC Bayern Munich II players
Alemannia Aachen players
SpVgg Unterhaching players
FC Rot-Weiß Erfurt players
KFC Uerdingen 05 players
Türkgücü München players
TSG 1899 Hoffenheim II players
2. Bundesliga players
3. Liga players
Regionalliga players
Footballers from Munich